G. Narsimha Reddy  is an Indian politician and was Member of Parliament of India. He was a member of the 6th and 7th Lok Sabhas. Reddy represented the Adilabad constituency of Andhra Pradesh and is a member of the Congress (I) political party.

Early life and education
G. Narsimha Reddy was born in the village Jakranpally, Nizamabad in the state of Andhra Pradesh. He attended the Osmania University and attained B.A degree. By profession, Reddy is an Agriculturist.

Political career
G. Narsimha Reddy was M.P from Adilabad constituency for two straight terms. He was also the Chairman of Zila Parishad in Adilabad district.

Posts held

See also

Parliament of India
Politics of India
Zila Parishad

References

India MPs 1977–1979
India MPs 1980–1984
1936 births
Telugu politicians
Indian National Congress politicians from Andhra Pradesh
Lok Sabha members from Andhra Pradesh
People from Adilabad district
Living people